Ursula Honour Smith married name Oakley (born 1942) is a former English international badminton player.

Badminton career
Smith born in 1942  was a winner of the All England Open Badminton Championships. She won the 1965 All England Open Badminton Championships women's singles.

Smith competed in the 1966 British Empire and Commonwealth Games in Kingston, Jamaica winning the gold medal in the women's doubles and bronze medal in the singles.	
She represented Herne Bay and Kent.

References

English female badminton players
1942 births
Commonwealth Games gold medallists for England
Commonwealth Games medallists in badminton
Living people
Badminton players at the 1966 British Empire and Commonwealth Games
Medallists at the 1966 British Empire and Commonwealth Games